The Coliban River, an inland perennial river of the northcentral catchment, part of the Murray-Darling basin, is located in the lower Riverina bioregion and Central Highlands region of the Australian state of Victoria. The headwaters of the Coliban River rise on the northern slopes of the Great Dividing Range and descend to flow north into the Campaspe River with the impounded Lake Eppalock.

The river is a major water supply source for towns and cities in the lower Central Highlands region.

Location and features
The river rises below Little Hampton near  in the Great Dividing Range and flows generally north, descending  over the Trentham Falls, and continuing to flow northward to the Upper Coliban, Lauriston and Malmsbury reservoirs. The river descends  over its  course.

Today, the system supplies drinking water to a population exceeding 200,000. Coliban Water manages the three major water supply reservoirs, which are part of the Eppalock Proclaimed Water Supply Catchment.

Fauna and flora
The river is home to the platypus as well as eight native fish species, including the Macquarie perch. Four of the fish species are endangered and the trout cod is regarded as critically endangered in the river, and may no longer be present. Indigenous vegetation in the area includes the black gum (Eucalyptus aggregata) which, though once plentiful in the area, is now rare due to vegetation clearance over many years.

Etymology
In the Aboriginal Djadjawurrung language, the name for the river is Teeranyap, with no clearly defined meaning. In the Taungurung and Djadjawurrung languages, the names for the river is  Pe-er, with no clearly defined meaning, and Dindelong yaluk, with yaluk meaning "river".

See also

References

External links

 Public Record Office Victoria Photograph of Victorian Railways passenger train crossing the viaduct over the Coliban River at Malmsbury, November 1945.

North-Central catchment
Rivers of Grampians (region)
Rivers of Loddon Mallee (region)
Central Highlands (Victoria)
Tributaries of the Murray River